Machi Tanaka (田中真知, born July 21, 1983) is a female long-distance runner from Japan, who is best known for winning the half marathon at the 2003 Summer Universiade. She attended Meijo University.

Achievements

Personal bests
3000 metres - 9:17.54 min (2001)
5000 metres - 15:39.52 min (2004)
10,000 metres - 32:27.01 min (2003)
Half marathon - 1:10:00 hrs (2004)

External links

1983 births
Living people
Japanese female long-distance runners
Universiade medalists in athletics (track and field)
Universiade gold medalists for Japan
Medalists at the 2003 Summer Universiade
20th-century Japanese women
21st-century Japanese women